Santanol may refer to either of two isomers of the sesquiterpene alcohol making up sandalwood oil, from Santalum species:

 α-Santalol, the larger fraction, comprising around 55% of sandalwood oil
 β-Santalol, the lesser fraction, comprising around 20% of sandalwood oil